Dehalogenimonas is a genus in the phylum Chloroflexota (Bacteria). Members of the genus Dehalogenimonas can be referred to as dehalogenimonads (viz. Trivialisation of names).

Etymology
The name Dehalogenimonas derives from:Latin prep. de, away, off; New Latin noun halogenum, halogen; Latin feminine gender noun monas (μονάς), unit, monad; New Latin feminine gender noun Dehalogenimonas, dehalogenating monad, reflecting the ability of these bacteria to dehalogenate chlorinated alkanes.

The type species of the genus is D. lykanthroporepellens ( Moe et al. 2009). The species epithet derives from the Greek noun lykanthropos (λυκάνθρωπος), werewolf; Latin participle adjective repellens, repelling; New Latin participle adjective lykanthroporepellens, repelling `werewolves, because compounds exhibiting a pungent garlic aroma are produced when these organisms grow in the presence of 1,2,3-trichloropropane as an electron acceptor and sulfide as a reducing agent, garlic being said to repel werewolves in some fiction literature.

Phylogeny
The currently accepted taxonomy is based on the List of Prokaryotic names with Standing in Nomenclature (LPSN) and National Center for Biotechnology Information (NCBI)

See also
 Bacterial taxonomy
 Microbiology
 List of bacterial orders
 List of bacteria genera

References 

Bacteria genera
Dehalococcoidetes